CLOVES syndrome is a rare overgrowth syndrome with complex vascular anomalies. CLOVES syndrome affects people with various symptoms, ranging from mild fatty soft-tissue tumors to vascular malformations encompassing the spine or internal organs.

It is a genetic disorder that results from somatic, mosaic gain-of-function mutations of the PIK3CA gene, and belongs to the spectrum of PIK3CA-related overgrowth syndromes (PROS). This rare condition has no specific treatment and a poor survival rate.

French doctor Guillaume Canaud published an article in Nature that demonstrate the efficacy of BYL719 (From cancer), an inhibitor of PIK3CA, in preventing and improving organ dysfunction. It seems this treatment is having tremendous and quick effects.

CLOVES syndrome is closely linked to other overgrowth disorders like proteus syndrome, Klippel–Trénaunay syndrome, Sturge–Weber syndrome, and hemihypertrophy, to name a few.

'CLOVES' is an acronym for:
 C is for congenital.
 L is for lipomatous, which means pertaining to or resembling a benign tumor made up of mature fat cells. Most CLOVES patients present with a soft fatty mass at birth, often visible on one or both sides of the back, legs and/or abdomen. 
 O is for overgrowth, because there is an abnormal increase in the size of the body or a body part that is often noted at birth. Patients with CLOVES may have affected areas of their bodies that grow faster than in other people. Overgrowth of extremities (usually arms or legs) is seen, with large wide hands or feet, large fingers or toes, wide space between fingers, and asymmetry of body parts.
 V is for vascular malformations, which are blood vessel abnormalities. Patients with CLOVES have different venous, capillary, and lymphatic channels - typically capillary, venous and lymphatic malformations are known as "slow flow" lesions. Some patients with CLOVES have combined lesions (which are fast flow) and some have aggressive vascular malformation known as arteriovenous malformations (AVM).  The effect of a vascular malformation varies per patient based on the type, size, and location of the malformation, and symptoms can vary.
 E is for Epidermal naevi, which are sharply-circumscribed chronic lesions of the skin, and benign. These are often flesh-colored, raised or warty.
 S is for Spinal/Skeletal Anomalies or scoliosis. Some patients with CLOVES have tethered spinal cord, vascular malformations in or around their spines, and other spinal differences. High-flow aggressive spinal lesions (like AVM) can cause serious neurological deficits/paralysis.

The syndrome was first recognised by Saap and colleagues who recognised the spectrum of symptoms from a set of seven patients. In this initial description the syndrome is named CLOVE syndrome. It is believed that the first description of a case of CLOVES syndrome was written by Hermann Friedberg, a German physician, in 1867.



Causes
Somatic mutations in the PIK3CA have been identified as a cause of CLOVES syndrome. PIK3CA is a protein involved in the PI3K-AKT signalling pathway. Mutations in other parts of this pathway cause other overgrowth syndromes including Proteus syndrome and hemimegalencephaly.

References

External links 

Vascular diseases
Rare genetic syndromes